Simon Greul was the defending champion but lost in the final to Aljaž Bedene.

Seeds

Draw

Finals

Top half

Bottom half

References
 Main Draw
 Qualifying Draw

Kosice Open - Singles
2012 Singles